Paul Teti (born February 5, 1977) is an American rower. He competed at the 2004 Summer Olympics in Athens, where he placed 9th in the men's lightweight coxless four with the American team. Teti was born in Upper Darby, Pennsylvania.

References

External links
 
 
 

1977 births
Living people
American male rowers
Olympic rowers of the United States
Rowers at the 2000 Summer Olympics
Rowers at the 2004 Summer Olympics
Rowers at the 2008 Summer Olympics
Pan American Games medalists in rowing
Pan American Games gold medalists for the United States
Rowers at the 1999 Pan American Games
Medalists at the 1999 Pan American Games